Latent-transforming growth factor beta-binding protein 3 is a protein that in humans is encoded by the LTBP3 gene.

References

Further reading